{{DISPLAYTITLE:C13H18N2O3}}
The molecular formula C13H18N2O3 (molar mass: 250.294 g/mol) may refer to:

 Heptabarb, or heptabarbital
 Lacosamide

Molecular formulas